Notable earthquakes in the history of Cyprus include the following:

See also 
 Geology of Cyprus
 Geology of Northern Cyprus

References

Sources

Earthquakes in Cyprus
Earthquakes
Cyprus